Sien is a village in the Toma Department in the province of Nayala in Burkina Faso. 
Sien has a population of 707.

References

Nayala Province
Populated places in the Boucle du Mouhoun Region